Huayllajirca (possibly from Quechua waylla meadow, Ancash Quechua hirka mountain, "meadow mountain") is a mountain in the Andes of Peru, about  high. It is located in the Lima Region, Cajatambo Province, Cajatambo District, and in the Oyón Province, Oyón District. Huayllajirca lies northwest of the mountain named Chalhuacocha and northeast of Pishtac and Tocto lake.

References

Mountains of Peru
Mountains of Lima Region